The Human Development Index (HDI) is a statistic composite index of life expectancy, education (mean years of schooling completed and expected years of schooling upon entering the education system), and per capita income indicators, which is used to rank countries into four tiers of human development. A country scores a higher level of HDI when the lifespan is higher, the education level is higher, and the gross national income GNI (PPP) per capita is higher. It was developed by  Pakistani economist Mahbub ul Haq and was further used to measure a country's development by the United Nations Development Programme (UNDP)'s Human Development Report Office.

The 2010 Human Development Report introduced an Inequality-adjusted Human Development Index (IHDI). While the simple HDI remains useful, it stated that "the IHDI is the actual level of human development (accounting for inequality), while the HDI can be viewed as an index of 'potential' human development (or the maximum level of HDI) that could be achieved if there were no inequality."

The index is based on the human development approach, developed by Mahbub ul Haq, anchored in Amartya Sen's work on human capabilities, and often framed in terms of whether people are able to "be" and "do" desirable things in life. Examples include – being: well fed, sheltered, healthy; doing: work, education, voting, participating in community life. The freedom of choice is central – someone choosing to be hungry (e.g. when fasting for religious reasons) is quite different from someone who is hungry because they cannot afford to buy food, or because the country is in a famine.

The index does not take into account several factors, such as the net wealth per capita or the relative quality of goods in a country. This situation tends to lower the ranking of some of the most developed countries, such as the G7 members and others.

Origins 

The origins of the HDI are found in the annual Human Development Reports produced by the Human Development Report Office of the United Nations Development Programme (UNDP). These were devised and launched by Pakistani economist Mahbub ul Haq in 1990, and had the explicit purpose "to shift the focus of development economics from national income accounting to people-centered policies". Haq believed that a simple composite measure of human development was needed to convince the public, academics, and politicians that they can and should evaluate development not only by economic advances but also improvements in human well-being.

Dimensions and calculation

New method (2010 HDI onwards) 

Published on 4 November 2010 (and updated on 10 June 2011), the 2010 Human Development Report calculated the HDI combining three dimensions:

 A long and healthy life: Life expectancy at birth
 Education: Mean years of schooling and expected years of schooling
 A decent standard of living: GNI per capita (PPP international dollars)
In its 2010 Human Development Report, the UNDP began using a new method of calculating the HDI. The following three indices are used:

1. Life Expectancy Index (LEI) 
LEI is equal to 1 when life expectancy at birth is 85 years, and 0 when life expectancy at birth is 20 years.
2. Education Index (EI) 
2.1 Mean Years of Schooling Index (MYSI) 
 Fifteen is the projected maximum of this indicator for 2025.
2.2 Expected Years of Schooling Index (EYSI) 
 Eighteen is equivalent to achieving a master's degree in most countries.
3. Income Index (II) 
II is 1 when GNI per capita is $75,000 and 0 when GNI per capita is $100.
Finally, the HDI is the geometric mean of the previous three normalized indices:

LE: Life expectancy at birth
MYS: Mean years of schooling (i.e. years that a person aged 25 or older has spent in formal education)
EYS: Expected years of schooling (i.e. total expected years of schooling for children under 18 years of age, incl. young men and women aged 13-17)
GNIpc: Gross national income at purchasing power parity per capita

Old method (HDI before 2010) 
The HDI combined three dimensions last used in its 2009 report:

 Life expectancy at birth, as an index of population health and longevity to HDI 
 Knowledge and education, as measured by the adult literacy rate (with two-thirds weighting) and the combined primary, secondary, and tertiary gross enrollment ratio (with one-third weighting).
 Standard of living, as indicated by the natural logarithm of gross domestic product per capita at purchasing power parity.

This methodology was used by the UNDP until their 2011 report.

The formula defining the HDI is promulgated by the United Nations Development Programme (UNDP). In general, to transform a raw variable, say , into a unit-free index between 0 and 1 (which allows different indices to be added together), the following formula is used:

 

The Human Development Index (HDI) then represents the uniformly weighted sum with  contributed by each of the following factor indices:

 Life Expectancy Index 
 Education Index = 
 Adult Literacy Index (ALI)
 Gross Enrollment Index (GEI) 
 GDP

2021 Human Development Index (2022 report) 

The Human Development Report 2022 by the United Nations Development Programme was released on 8 September 2022 and calculates HDI values based on data collected in 2021.

The following countries ranked from 1 to 66 in the year 2021 are considered to be of "very high human development":

Past top countries 
The list below displays the top-ranked country from each year of the Human Development Index. Norway has been ranked the highest sixteen times, Canada eight times, Japan and Iceland twice and Switzerland once.

In each original HDI 
The year represents the time period from which the statistics for the index were derived. In parentheses is the year when the report was published.

Geographical coverage 
The HDI has extended its geographical coverage: David Hastings, of the United Nations Economic and Social Commission for Asia and the Pacific, published a report geographically extending the HDI to 230+ economies, whereas the UNDP HDI for 2009 enumerates 182 economies and coverage for the 2010 HDI dropped to 169 countries.

Country/region specific HDI lists

 African countries
 Argentinean provinces
 Australian states
 Austrian states
 Baltic Regions
 Belgian provinces
 Bolivian departments
 Bosnia and Herzegovina regions
 Brazilian states
 Canadian provinces and territories
 Chilean regions
 Chinese administrative divisions
 Colombian departments
 Croatian counties
 Danish regions
 Dutch provinces
 Ethiopian regions
 European countries
 French regions
 German states
 Greek regions 
 Indian states
 Tamil Nadu districts (India)
 Indonesian provinces
 Iranian provinces
 Iraqi governorates
 Italian regions
 Japanese prefectures
 Latin American countries
 Malaysian states
 Mexican states
 Nepalese provinces
 New Zealand regions
 Nigerian states
 Pakistani administrative units
 Philippine provinces
 Palestinian regions
 Polish voivodeships
 Russian federal subjects
 South African provinces
 South Korean regions
 Spanish communities
 Swedish regions
 Swiss regions
 Thai regions
 Turkish regions
 UK regions
 U.S. states (American Human Development Report (AHDR))
 Venezuelan states
 Vietnamese regions

Criticism 

The Human Development Index has been criticized on a number of grounds, including alleged lack of consideration of technological development or contributions to the human civilization, focusing exclusively on national performance and ranking, lack of attention to development from a global perspective, measurement error of the underlying statistics, and on the UNDP's changes in formula which can lead to severe misclassification in the categorisation of "low", "medium", "high" or "very high" human development countries.

Sources of data error 
Economists Hendrik Wolff, Howard Chong and Maximilian Auffhammer discuss the HDI from the perspective of data error in the underlying health, education and income statistics used to construct the HDI. They identified three sources of data error which are due to (i) data updating, (ii) formula revisions and (iii) thresholds to classify a country's development status and conclude that 11%, 21% and 34% of all countries can be interpreted as currently misclassified in the development bins due to the three sources of data error, respectively. The authors suggest that the United Nations should discontinue the practice of classifying countries into development bins because: the cut-off values seem arbitrary, can provide incentives for strategic behavior in reporting official statistics, and have the potential to misguide politicians, investors, charity donors and the public who use the HDI at large.

In 2010, the UNDP reacted to the criticism and updated the thresholds to classify nations as low, medium, and high human development countries. In a comment to The Economist in early January 2011, the Human Development Report Office responded to a 6 January 2011 article in the magazine which discusses the Wolff et al. paper. The Human Development Report Office states that they undertook a systematic revision of the methods used for the calculation of the HDI, and that the new methodology directly addresses the critique by Wolff et al. in that it generates a system for continuously updating the human-development categories whenever formula or data revisions take place.

In 2013, Salvatore Monni and Alessandro Spaventa emphasized that in the debate of GDP versus HDI, it is often forgotten that these are both external indicators that prioritize different benchmarks upon which the quantification of societal welfare can be predicated. The larger question is whether it is possible to shift the focus of policy from a battle between competing paradigms to a mechanism for eliciting information on well-being directly from the population.

See also

Indices

 Bhutan GNH Index
 Broad measures of economic progress
 Corruption Perceptions Index
 Democracy Index
 Fragile States Index
 Gender Inequality Index
 Gender-related Development Index
 Genuine Progress Indicator (GPI)
 Global Peace Index (GPI)
 Green gross domestic product (Green GDP)
 Green national product
 Gross domestic product
 Gross National Well-being (GNW)
 Happy Planet Index (HPI)
 Human Poverty Index
 Inequality-adjusted Human Development Index (IHDI)
 Legatum Prosperity Index
 List of countries by Human Development Index
 Living planet index
 Multidimensional Poverty Index
 OECD Better Life Index (BLI)
 Planetary pressures–adjusted Human Development Index (PHDI)
 Press Freedom Index
 Rule of Law Index
 Social Progress Index
 Where-to-be-born Index
 World Happiness Report

Other

 Developing country
 Economic development
 Ethics of care
 Happiness economics
 Human Development and Capability Association
 Humanistic economics
 International development
 List of countries by percentage of population living in poverty
 List of countries by share of income of the richest one percent
 Right to an adequate standard of living
 Subjective life satisfaction
 Sustainable Development Goals (SDGs)

Notes

References

External links 

 Human Development Index
 Human Development Tools and Rankings

 
Development economics
Environmental economics
International rankings
Science and technology in India
Science and technology in Pakistan
American inventions
British inventions
Indian inventions
Pakistani inventions
1990 establishments

sah:HDI